Kinokuniya Bunzaemon (紀伊国屋文左衛門) (1669 – 1734) was a Japanese merchant of the Edo period, specializing in citrus, lumber, and salmon, among other goods. He enjoyed the favoritism and protection of shogunal advisor Yanagisawa Yoshiyasu and shogunal minister of finances Ogura Shigehide, and made a sizeable fortune as a result. When these two retired, so did Kinokuniya.

References
Frederic, Louis (2002). "Kinokuniya Bunzaemon." Japan Encyclopedia. Cambridge, Massachusetts: Harvard University Press.
Sansom, George (1963). "A History of Japan: 1615-1867." Stanford, California: Stanford University Press.

Japanese merchants
1734 deaths
1669 births
17th-century Japanese businesspeople
17th-century merchants
18th-century Japanese businesspeople
18th-century merchants